In quantum chemistry, size consistency and size extensivity are concepts relating to how the behaviour of quantum chemistry calculations changes with size. Size consistency (or strict separability) is a property that guarantees the consistency of the energy behaviour when interaction between the involved molecular system is nullified (for example, by distance). Size-extensivity, introduced by Bartlett, is a more mathematically formal characteristic which refers to the correct (linear) scaling of a method with the number of electrons.

Let A and B be two non-interacting systems. If a given theory for the evaluation of the energy is size consistent, then the energy of the supersystem A+B, separated by a sufficiently large distance so there is essentially no shared electron density, is equal to the sum of the energy of A plus the energy of B taken by themselves . This property of size consistency is of particular importance to obtain correctly behaving dissociation curves.  Others have more recently argued that the entire potential energy surface should be well-defined.

Size consistency and size extensivity are sometimes used interchangeably in the literature, However, there are very important distinctions to be made between them. Hartree–Fock, coupled cluster, many-body perturbation theory (to any order), and full configuration interaction (CI) are size extensive but not always size consistent. For example, the Restricted Hartree–Fock model is not able to correctly describe the dissociation curves of H2 and therefore all post HF methods that employ HF as a starting point will fail in that matter (so-called single-reference methods). Sometimes numerical errors can cause a method that is formally size-consistent to behave in a non-size-consistent manner.

Core-extensivity is yet another related property, which extends the requirement to the proper treatment of excited states.

References 

Quantum chemistry